King Cheng may refer to the following Chinese figures:

 Tang of Shang ( 1675–1646 BC), also known as King Cheng Tang (Chéng Tāng Wáng)
 King Cheng of Zhou (Zhōu Chéng Wáng;  1055–1021 BC)
 King Cheng of Chu (Chǔ Chéng Wáng; died 626 BC)
 Qin Shi Huang (259–210 BC), also known as King Cheng of Qin (Zhào Zhèng)

See also
Duke Cheng (disambiguation)
Marquis Cheng (disambiguation)